Alowal or Allowal is a village in Shaheed Bhagat Singh Nagar district of Punjab State, India. The village is administered by Sarpanch an elected representative of the village.

Demography 
As of 2011, Alowal has a total number of 43 houses and population of 217 of which 119 include are males while 98 are females according to the report published by Census India in 2011. The literacy rate of Alowal is 72.92%, lower than the state average of 75.84%. The population of children under the age of 6 years is 25 which is 11.52% of total population of Alowal, and child sex ratio is approximately 667 as compared to Punjab state average of 846.

Most of the people are from Schedule Caste which constitutes 92.17% of total population in Alowal. The town does not have any Schedule Tribe population so far.

As per the report published by Census India in 2011, 95 people were engaged in work activities out of the total population of Alowal which includes 67 males and 28 females. According to census survey report 2011, 14.74% workers describe their work as main work and 85.26% workers are involved in Marginal activity providing livelihood for less than 6 months.

Education 
The village has a Punjabi medium, co-ed upper primary school founded in 1960. The schools provide mid-day meal which prepared in School premises as per Indian Midday Meal Scheme. The school provide free education to children between the ages of 6 and 14 as per Right of Children to Free and Compulsory Education Act. Amardeep Singh Shergill Memorial college Mukandpur and Sikh National College Banga, KC Engineering College and Doaba Khalsa Trust Group Of Institutions are the nearest colleges.

Transport 

See also 
List of villages in India

References

External links 
 Tourism of Punjab 
 Census of Punjab
 Locality Based PINCode

Villages in Shaheed Bhagat Singh Nagar district